Jeff Storrs (born April 13, 1965) is a former U.S. soccer goalkeeper who spent two seasons in the Western Soccer Alliance and one in the American Professional Soccer League.

College
Storrs attended Seattle Pacific University where he played on the men’s soccer team from 1985 to 1988.  Seattle Pacific plays in the NCAA Second Division.  In 1986, he was a second team All-American as Seattle Pacific took the Division II championship over Oakland University; and also the MVP of the National Championship team.  In 1987, Storrs was the Division II first team All-American goalkeeper and a finalist for the NCAA Soccer Player of the Year.

Professional
Storrs played with the Seattle Storm of the Western Soccer League (WSL) from 1987 to 1990.  He began the 1987 season as the starter, but after being injured he had to sit out for most of the season.  In 1990, he was the starter, but a herniated disc ended his career.  In 1989, he was hampered by a disc injury which kept him out of the lineup for most of the year.  In 1990, the WSL merged with the American Soccer League to form the American Professional Soccer League.  After one year in the new league, the Storm folded and Storrs retired from playing professionally.

References

External links

 Seattle Pacific stats
 1988 Seattle Storm roster
 1990 Storm profile

1965 births
Living people
Western Soccer Alliance players
American Professional Soccer League players
Seattle Storm (soccer) players
Association football goalkeepers
American soccer players
Seattle Pacific Falcons men's soccer players
Seattle Pacific Falcons men's soccer coaches
American soccer coaches